Bahria College Islamabad (Urdu: بحریہ کالج اسلام آباد) is a college located in Islamabad, Pakistan. Its foundation stone was laid by the Chief of Naval Staff Admiral Iftikhar Ahmed Sirohey on 30 August 1986 under the supervision of Pakistan Navy.

Campus 
The campus of the college is located in the heart of the capital city facing the panoramic Margalla Hills, located in Sector E-8, Naval Complex, Islamabad, Pakistan.

Administration 
It provides education to students from kindergarten up to the HSSC/A-level, And having three sections, Montessori section, primary section and secondary section (Boys wing, Girls wing and Cambridge wing). Each wing and section is headed by a vice principal.

College is administered by Pakistan Navy and important decisions and orders are made under the supervision of Commander North and Naval Headquarters.

The college has its own annually published magazine called the Shanawar.

Notable alumni
Javed Malik (Pakistan's Ambassador to the Kingdom of Bahrain)
Osman Khalid Butt (Pakistani actor)
Abdullah Qureshi (Pakistani singer)
Usman Mukhtar (Pakistani actor)
Mawra Hocane (Pakistani actress)
Urwa Hocane (Pakistani actress)

References

Schools in Islamabad
1986 establishments in Pakistan